The Journal-News is a newspaper based in Hillsboro, Illinois.  It was formed by the 2004 merger of two Hillsboro newspapers: the Hillsboro Journal, which had existed since 1886, and the Montgomery County News, which had existed since 1983.   the paper was owned by John and Susan Galer.

References

External links
 The Journal-News — official site
 Hillsboro Journal at the Illinois Digital Newspaper Collection — issues from January 1, 1886, to December 25, 1891

2004 establishments in Illinois
Publications established in 2004
Independent newspapers published in the United States
Montgomery County, Illinois
Newspapers published in Illinois